Dichomeris nitiellus is a moth in the family Gelechiidae. It is found in Italy and Switzerland.

References

Moths described in 1922
nitiellus